Ralph Strunk Edwards (December 4, 1882 – January 5, 1949) was an American professional baseball infielder. He played for the Philadelphia Athletics during the  season.

References

Major League Baseball infielders
Philadelphia Athletics players
Baseball players from New York (state)
1882 births
1949 deaths
People from Brewster, New York
People from White Plains, New York